Tittle is a surname. Notable people with the surname include:

 Ian Tittle (born 1973), West Indian cricket player
 LaDonna Tittle (born 1946), American radio personality, model and actress
 Minnie Tittle (1875–1974) American actress, better known under her stage name of Minnie Tittell Brune  
 Steve Tittle (born 1935), Canadian composer and teacher
 Y. A. Tittle (1926-2017), American football quarterback

English-language surnames